As Negradas may refer to either of two municipalities in the autonomous community of Lugo, Galicia, Spain:
San Miguel das Negradas
San Vicente de As Negradas